1988 in philosophy

Events 
 Paul Thieme was awarded the 1988 Kyoto Prize in Arts and Philosophy for "he added immensely to our knowledge of Vedic and other classical Indian literature and provided a solid foundation to the study of the history of Indian thought". 
 The Indian philosopher and writer Raja Rao was awarded the 1988 Neustadt International Prize for Literature.

Publications 
 Ernst Mayr, Toward a New Philosophy of Biology (1988)
 Stephen Hawking, A Brief History of Time (1988)
 Hans Moravec, Mind Children: The Future of Robot and Human Intelligence (1988)
 Jürgen Habermas, Postmetaphysical Thinking (1988)

Deaths 
 February 16 - Ye Shengtao (born 1894)
 June 23 - Liang Shuming (born 1893)
 June 26 - Hans Urs von Balthasar (born 1905)

References 

Philosophy
20th-century philosophy
Philosophy by year